The Rotortec Cloud Dancer Light is a German autogyro, designed and produced by Rotortec of Görisried, Allgäu. The aircraft is supplied as a complete ready-to-fly-aircraft.

Design and development
Based on the enclosed cockpit Rotortec Cloud Dancer I, the Cloud Dancer Light was designed as a lower cost model for the German 120 kg ultralight class. It features a single two-bladed rotor, a single-seat open cockpit without a windshield, tricycle landing gear with wheel pants and a twin cylinder, liquid-cooled  Hirth 3503 two stroke engine mounted in pusher configuration.

The aircraft fuselage frame is made from aluminum, while the tail is Kevlar composites. The instrument panel is mounted in a simple pod.

Specifications (Cloud Dancer Light)

References

External links

Official photos of the Cloud Dancer Light

2000s German sport aircraft
Single-engined pusher autogyros